MusicBee is a freeware media player for playback and organization of audio files on Microsoft Windows, built using the  audio library.

Features
 Audio playback: MP3, AAC, M4A, MPC, OGG, FLAC, ALAC, APE, Opus, WavPack, WMA, WAV, MIDI, MOD, UMX, XM.
 CDDA support: playback and ripping (CD-Text-capable) of audio CDs. Tracks can be ripped (in fast or secure mode), as individual files or as a single album with embedded cuesheet.
 Synchronization: ability to sync content from local libraries with external devices (including iOS 3.0-based and earlier), and import libraries from iTunes and Windows Media Player.
 File converter: single/batch file conversion from/to all supported audio formats, with original metadata preserved. In dealing with identical output files instances, provided that re-encoding is unnecessary, the process has optional instructions for selective skipping in favor of performing a tag-only synchronization.
 Gapless playback: eliminates the timing related artifacts in transitions between consecutive audio tracks to provide a relatively uninterrupted listening experience.
 ReplayGain: performs normalization of volume levels among individual tracks, equalizing their perceived loudness to achieve a more seamless playlist progression.
 Library management: find, organize and rename music into particular folders and files based on any combination of audio tag values such as artist, album, track number, or other metadata. MusicBee can be configured to monitor and perform this task automatically for select libraries, while at the same time allowing users to take manual control on a case-by-case basis.
 Scrobbling: ability to share current playback information from MusicBee to Last.fm.
 Look and feel customization: the layout and appearance of various player elements is open for extensive modification, including adjustable key bindings.
  integration: for display and editing of song lyrics synchronized to audio files.
 Built-in WASAPI and ASIO sound card interfaces.
 Auto DJ: a user-programmable playlist generator, expanding beyond capabilities of the default shuffle presets and settings.
 Sleep & Shutdown modes, for scheduled exit with gradual volume fade out function.
 Web scraping: integrates Fanart.tv, and similar providers, to retrieve high-quality pictures of artists and album covers for music in library.
 Plug-in support: additional features in the form of community extensions (see below).

Add-on components
 Custom skins
 Winamp, BassBox, Windows Media Player and Sonique music visualizations
 Web Browser: analyses web pages for MP3 files, presenting the results for user to playback/download.
 Subsonic client
 Additional audio tagging tools
 MusicBee Remote plugin and corresponding app for Android devices
 DiscordBee a plugin that shows your friends what you've been listening to
 media control: a plugin that lets your control musicbee with windows 10 built-in media controls
 musicbee upnp: lets you share your library with devices on your network (not supported)

See also
 Comparison of audio player software

References

External links
 

IPod software
Windows-only freeware
Windows media players
Tag editors
Windows CD ripping software
Jukebox-style media players